Green Township is one of eleven townships in Randolph County, Indiana. As of the 2010 census, its population was 957 and it contained 404 housing units.

History
Green Township was established in 1834.

Geography

Unincorporated towns
 Fairview at 
 Shedville at 
(This list is based on USGS data and may include former settlements.)

References

External links
 Indiana Township Association
 United Township Association of Indiana

Townships in Randolph County, Indiana
Townships in Indiana